

Konrad Barde (13 November 1897 – 4 May 1945) was a general in the Wehrmacht during World War II. He was a recipient of the Knight's Cross of the Iron Cross. Barde committed suicide on 4 May 1945.

Awards and decorations
 Iron Cross (1914)
 2nd Class
 1st Class
 Iron Cross (1939)
 2nd Class
 1st Class
 German Cross in Gold on 26 December 1941 as Oberstleutnant in the IV./Artillerie-Regiment 104
 Knight's Cross of the Iron Cross on 5 January 1943 as Oberst and commander of Artillerie-Regiment 104

References

Citations

Bibliography

 
 

1897 births
1945 deaths
Major generals of the German Army (Wehrmacht)
Recipients of the Knight's Cross of the Iron Cross
Recipients of the Gold German Cross
Recipients of the Iron Cross, 1st class
German military personnel who committed suicide
People from Olesno County
German Army personnel of World War I